Abbott Elementary is an American mockumentary sitcom television series created by Quinta Brunson for ABC. It stars Brunson as Janine Teagues, a positive second-grade teacher at the poorly funded Abbott Elementary, a fictional predominantly black school in Philadelphia. The ensemble cast includes Tyler James Williams, Janelle James, Lisa Ann Walter, Chris Perfetti, William Stanford Davis, and Sheryl Lee Ralph.

The series premiered as a midseason entry in the 2021–22 television season on December 7, 2021, and was met with critical acclaim; the show's first season was nominated for seven Primetime Emmy Awards, winning three. In March 2022, the series was renewed for a 22-episode second season, which premiered on September 21, 2022. In January 2023, the series was renewed for a third season.

Premise
Willard R. Abbott Elementary School is a predominantly black Philadelphia public school where a documentary crew is recording the lives of teachers working in underfunded, mismanaged schools. Conditions at the school are harsh and most teachers do not last more than two years. Optimistic second grade teacher Janine Teagues is determined to help her students despite the circumstances. She works with awkward, good-intentioned history teacher Jacob Hill; experienced, no-nonsense kindergarten teacher Barbara Howard; and experienced second grade teacher Melissa Schemmenti, Barbara's close friend who has questionable connections. They are joined by new school principal Ava Coleman, who is tone-deaf, unqualified, and uninvested, and recent substitute hire Gregory Eddie, who was rejected after applying for the position of principal.

Cast and characters

 Quinta Brunson as Janine Teagues, an optimistic second-grade teacher who has a mission to help the lives of her students while also managing her own personal life.
 Tyler James Williams as Gregory Eddie, a substitute, later full-time, first-grade teacher who harbors a crush on Janine.
 Janelle James as Ava Coleman, the school's inept principal who enjoys picking on and bullying her co-workers, specifically Janine.
 Lisa Ann Walter as Melissa Schemmenti, a second-grade teacher with questionable connections.
 Chris Perfetti as Jacob Hill, an awkward history teacher who supports Janine and her mission.
 Sheryl Lee Ralph as Barbara Howard, an old-school kindergarten teacher whom Janine looks up to.
 William Stanford Davis as Mr. Johnson (season 2; recurring season 1), the school's eccentric, but surprisingly talented, custodian.

Episodes

Series overview

Season 1 (2021–22)

Season 2 (2022–23)

Production

Background 
Brunson stated that her mother's forty-year career as a schoolteacher is what inspired her to create Abbott Elementary, and named the series' titular school after Joyce Abbott, one of her own, real-life elementary school teachers. Additionally, the series is set in Brunson's hometown of Philadelphia. She also stated that the character of Barbara Howard, played by Sheryl Lee Ralph, is based on her mother.

Development 

On September 3, 2020, an untitled workplace comedy pilot starring Brunson landed a put pilot commitment at ABC with Brunson, Justin Halpern and Patrick Schumacker serving as executive producers.

In February 2021, ABC gave the project an official pilot order, originally with the title of Harrity Elementary. In May, the project was given a series order under a new name of Abbott Elementary. Filming for the first season began on August 16, 2021, in Los Angeles, California, and concluded on November 5, 2021. In August, three crew members tested positive for COVID-19 but production was not impacted.

The first season premiered on December 7, 2021, and concluded on April 12, 2022, consisting of 13 episodes. On March 14, 2022, just before the first season was set to conclude, the series was renewed for a second season.
According to a tweet made by Quinta Brunson, the first day of filming for the second season began on July 18, 2022. On July 21, 2022, ABC ordered the second season of 22 episodes, giving it a full-season order. On January 11, 2023, ABC renewed the series for a third season.

Casting 
In March 2021, Tyler James Williams, Janelle James, Lisa Ann Walter, Chris Perfetti, and Sheryl Lee Ralph were announced to star in the series alongside Brunson. In November of the same year, William Stanford Davis was confirmed to recur as Mr. Johnson, the janitor. Brunson portrays Janine Teagues, the optimistic second-grade teacher who leads the series and its ensemble. Williams portrays Gregory Eddie, a substitute first-grade teacher who harbors a crush on Janine. James portrays Ava Coleman, the school's inept principal. Walter portrays Melissa Schemmenti, a second-grade teacher alongside Janine. Perfetti portrays Jacob Hill, an awkward history teacher, and Ralph portrays Barbara Howard, an old-school kindergarten teacher whom Janine looks up to.

In an interview with Insider, Brunson revealed that her character of Janine Teagues was originally planned to be just a side character in the series, as a staff member of Abbott. During the initial visions of the series, Barbara Howard was meant to be the "driving force" of the series.

In July 2022, just months prior to the series returning for its second season, it was announced that Davis would be promoted to series regular for the season. Additionally, a week before the season premiere it was announced via The Wrap that the season would see the introduction of various recurring guest stars, including Lauren Weedman as Kristen Marie, Leslie Odom Jr. as Draemond Winding and Keyla Monterroso Mejia as Ashley Garcia. All of whom appeared within the first eight episodes of the season.

The second season also featured a cameo from Philadelphia Flyers mascot Gritty in the premiere episode, which garnered a large amount of online attention. When asked by the National Hockey League, executive producer Patrick Schumacker stated that Gritty's appearance in the series was "a long time coming." He revealed that Gritty was originally due to appear in one of the early episodes of the first season, but scheduling conflicts delayed the cameo.

Music 
The series does not use any original music or score written or recorded for it, instead using pre-existing and/or library music, often used as diegetic music (or source music), often performed "live" by cast members.  The previously released song, "Hold'em", performed by Maker, was used as its main title theme.

Release
In the US, the show airs on ABC and streams on Hulu with next-day availability and HBO Max after each season. In Australia and New Zealand the show was first released on Disney+ under the Star content hub on February 16 as a Star Original with a 6 episode premiere with new episodes weekly before airing in several countries in Europe such as UK, France, Italy and Germany.

In Canada, the series airs on Global, with episodes available to stream on the Global TV app the next day. The first season is currently available to stream on Disney+ under the Star content hub.

Reception

Critical response

On Rotten Tomatoes, the first season holds an approval rating of 98% with an average rating of 8.3 out of 10, based on 45 reviews. The site's critical consensus said, "Abbott Elementary earns top marks for its empathetic yet sidesplitting critique of the U.S. education system, plus some extra credit for a deftly handled will-they-won't-they dynamic." Metacritic, which uses a weighted average, assigned a score of 80 out of 100 based on 16 critics, indicating "generally favorable reviews".

Angie Han of The Hollywood Reporter said "[it] works well enough to deliver a consistent good time — and I suspect that given time, Abbott Elementary could blossom into something truly special". Han also said the first episodes "[are] a willingness to deal with class head on, while also finding humor in the characters' situations", and concluded that Abbott Elementary is "crowd-pleasing."

On Rotten Tomatoes, the second season has received an approval rating of 100% with an average rating of 9 out of 10, based on 18 reviews. The site's critical consensus reads, "Class is back in session and the plucky teachers of Abbott Elementary remain an absolute delight, with creator/star Quinta Brunson's savvy and sweet sensibility honed to perfection." Meanwhile, Metacritic has reported an average rating of 90 out of 100, based on eight reviews, indicating "universal acclaim".

Ratings

Accolades

References

External links
 
 

2020s American workplace comedy television series
2020s American school television series
2020s American black sitcoms
2020s American mockumentary television series
2020s American single-camera sitcoms
2021 American television series debuts
American Broadcasting Company original programming
English-language television shows
Best Musical or Comedy Series Golden Globe winners
Television series by 20th Century Fox Television
Television series by Warner Bros. Television Studios
Television shows set in Philadelphia
Television series about educators
Elementary school television series
Primetime Emmy Award-winning television series